Natalie Papazoglu (Natalija Papazohlu; born 1983) is a Gagauz-Ukrainian singer-songwriter. She participated in season 6 of the Ukrainian X-Factor, and won the Turkvision Song Contest 2020 with the song "Tikenli yol", representing .

Early life 

Papazoglu was born in Kalush, Ukraine in 1983 to a Gagauz father. She was a student at Borys Hrinchenko Kyiv University.

Career

X-Factor 

In 2015, Papazoglu participated in season 6 of the Ukrainian X-Factor, finishing in fourth place.

Turkvision Song Contest 

Papazoglu had originally been selected to represent  in the Turkvision Song Contest 2016, however the contest was later cancelled. She was again selected to represent Ukraine in the  contest with the self-written song "Tikenli yol", which had originally been written for the 2016 contest. She had expressed regret that the competition would be held online, stating that it did not allow her to show all of her team's ideas. She won the contest, held on 20 December 2020, with 226 points. Ukrainian Foreign Minister Dmytro Kuleba congratulated Papazoglu on her victory.

Discography

Extended plays

Singles

References

External links 

Gagauz people
1983 births
People from Kalush, Ukraine
The X Factor contestants
Turkvision Song Contest entrants
21st-century Ukrainian women singers
Ukrainian pop singers
Living people
Turkvision Song Contest winners